The 1996-1997 season was FK Sarajevo's 48th season in history, and their 3rd consecutive season in the top flight of Bosnian football.

Players

Squad

(Captain)

(Captain)

Statistics

Kit

Competitions

Premier League

League table

References

FK Sarajevo seasons
Sarajevo